Crassispira cymation is an extinct species of sea snail, a marine gastropod mollusk in the family Pseudomelatomidae, the turrids and allies.

Description
The length of the shell attains 8 mm, its diameter 3.3 mm.

Distribution
Fossils have been found in Miocene strata in Panama; age range: 11.608 to 7.246 Ma.

References

 W. P. Woodring. 1970. Geology and paleontology of canal zone and adjoining parts of Panama: Description of Tertiary mollusks (gastropods: Eulimidae, Marginellidae to Helminthoglyptidae). United States Geological Survey Professional Paper 306(D):299–452

cymation
Gastropods described in 1970